Fear of the Dark is a 1978 studio album by guitarist Gordon Giltrap. The album is the last of the album trilogy that started with 1976's Visionary and continued with 1977's Perilous Journey.

It was remixed and re-released in 1998.

Iron Maiden who released a similarly titled album in 1992 with drummer Nicko McBrain, who played on an earlier Giltrap album, and Giltrap notes that the Iron Maiden logo uses a similar font to the "Gordon Giltrap" logo on this album.

Track listing
All music composed by Gordon Giltrap; except where noted.

Side one
 "Roots (Part One and Two)"  – 6:11
 "Nightrider" (Gordon Giltrap, Rod Edwards, Roger Hand)  – 5:44
 "Inner Dream"  – 5:03
 "Weary Eyes" (Gordon Giltrap, Rod Edwards, Roger Hand)  – 4:46

Side two
 "Fast Approaching"  – 5:04
 "Melancholy Lullaby"  – 2:28
 "Fear of the Dark" (Gordon Giltrap, Rod Edwards, Roger Hand)  – 7:56
 "Visitation"  – 4:26

Personnel
 Gordon Giltrap - acoustic and electric guitars, vocals
 Rod Edwards - keyboards, piano, synthesizer, string arrangements, vocals
 John G. Perry - Wal electric bass
 Simon Phillips - drums
with:
Tony Carr - percussion
Roger Hand - vocals; rhythm guitar on "Weary Eyes"; string arrangements, conductor
Clive Bunker - additional drums on "Fast Approaching"
Graham Preskett - violin
Shirlie Roden - vocals
Technical
Roger T. Wake - engineer
Bob Bowkett - art direction
Paul Kale - sleeve concept
Ged Grimmel - artwork effects, photography

References

External links
Gordon Giltrap's website

1978 albums
Gordon Giltrap albums